At least two ships in the Soviet Navy  have been named Varyag after the Varangian people, the Viking ancestors of the Rus.

  - A  missile cruiser completed in 1965, and decommissioned in 1990.

Soviet Navy ship names